Brothers Union is a cricket team that plays List A cricket in the Dhaka Premier League. It is affiliated with the Brothers Union football team.

List A record
 2013-14: 10 matches, won 4, finished seventh
 2014-15: 11 matches, won 5, finished eighth
 2015-16: 11 matches, won 4, finished tenth
 2016-17: 11 matches, won 5, finished eighth
 2017-18: 13 matches, won 6, finished tenth
 2018-19: 13 matches, won 4, finished tenth
 2021-22: 11 matches, won 4, finished ninth
The List A captains have been Suhrawadi Shuvo in 2013–14, Nazimuddin in 2014–15, Tushar Imran in 2015-16 and Alok Kapali in 2016-17 and 2017–18.

In their last match of the 2017–18 season, Brothers Union needed to score 335 runs to beat Agrani Bank and avoid relegation. At the end, they needed four off the last ball of the 50th over, and Nazmus Sadat hit a boundary to secure victory by four wickets.

Current squad
Players with international caps are listed in bold

Records
The highest score is 150 not out by Nafees Iqbal in 2013–14, and the best bowling figures are 7 for 25 by Sean Williams, also in 2013–14.

References

External links
 List A matches played by Brothers Union

Dhaka Premier Division Cricket League teams